Fernando Ramirez (born 30 May 1974, in Santo Domingo, Dominican Republic) is a retired athlete who competed for Norway in the sprinting events. He represented his adopted country at the 1995 World Championships, as well as two indoor World Championships.

His 60 metres personal best of 6.57 was the Norwegian record between 1996 and 2008.

He represented the club IL i BUL.

Competition record

Personal bests
Outdoor
100 metres – 10.33 (+0.9 m/s) (Oslo 1995)
Indoor
60 metres – 6.57 (Liévin 1996)

References

1974 births
Living people
Norwegian male sprinters
Dominican Republic emigrants to Norway
Naturalised citizens of Norway
Norwegian athletics coaches